Angaliastos , is a kind of Greek folk dance from Crete, Greece. It is very widespread in Crete and Greek islands, too. It is called angaliastos which means "hugged", because it gives the opportunity for young people of island, to embrace the partner girls, with which they used to dance.

See also
Music of Greece
Greek dances

References
Ελληνικοί παραδοσιακοί χοροί: Αγκαλιαστός

Greek dances
Greek music